Doctor Death: Seeker of Souls is a 1973 American horror film directed by Eddie Saeta and starring John Considine, Barry Coe, Cheryl Miller, Stewart Moss, Leon Askin, and Jo Morrow. The film was released by Cinerama Releasing Corporation in October 1973.

Plot

Cast
John Considine as Dr. Death
Barry Coe as Fred Saunders
Cheryl Miller as Sandy
Stewart Moss as Greg Vaughn
Leon Askin as Thor
Jo Morrow as Laura Saunders
Florence Marly as Tana
Sivi Aberg as Venus
Jim Boles as Caretaker Franz
Athena Lorde as Spiritualist
Moe Howard as Volunteer in the Audience (final film)
Larry Vincent as The Strangler (as Larry 'Seymour' Vincent)

Release

Home media
The film was released on DVD by Cinerama on January 26, 2010.

Reception

Ian Jane from DVD Talk gave the film a positive review, writing, "Doctor Death is a whole lot of fun. It's campy and spends much of its running time with tongue placed firmly in cheek but Considine's performance is great and as predictable as the whole thing might be, it's ridiculously entertaining." Andrew Pragasam from The Spinning Image awarded the film 4/10 stars, calling it "trashy nonsense". TV Guide gave the film 1/5 stars, writing "Overall, this is a pretty bad effort, but camp fans may get some satisfaction from the cameo appearances by former Stooge Moe Howard and TV horror host Larry "Seymour" Vincent."

References

External links
 
 
 
 
 

1973 films
1973 horror films
American horror films
Cinerama Releasing Corporation films
Films scored by Richard LaSalle
1970s English-language films
1970s American films